Jogan is a 1950 Hindi–language romantic drama film directed by Kidar Nath Sharma, the film stars Dilip Kumar and Nargis. It features the hit song "Ghunghat Ke Pat Khol" sung by Geeta Dutt. Rajendra Kumar in his film debut plays a small role.

A box office success, the film became the fourth highest earning film of 1950, earning an approximate gross of Rs. 1,12,00,000 and a net of Rs. 62,00,000.

Cast
Dilip Kumar as Vijay
Nargis as Surabhi / Meera
Pratima Devi as Maha Maa
Purnima
Tabassum as Mangu
Rajendra Kumar as Raj (Vijay's Friend)

Soundtrack

References

External links
 
 Review Essay in Visual Anthropology

1950 films
1950s Hindi-language films
1950 romantic drama films
Films scored by Bulo C. Rani
Indian black-and-white films
Indian romantic drama films